Katnur is a village in Dharwad district of Karnataka, India.

Demographics 
As of the 2011 Census of India there were 363 households in Katnur and a total population of 1,890, consisting of 961 males and 929 females. There were 223 children ages 0-6.

References

Villages in Dharwad district